Interpolation theorem may refer to:

Craig interpolation in logic
Marcinkiewicz interpolation theorem about non-linear operators
Riesz–Thorin interpolation theorem about linear operators
Polynomial interpolation in analysis